KFOR (1240 kHz) is an AM radio station broadcasting a News Talk Information format. Licensed to Lincoln, Nebraska, United States, the station serves the Lincoln area.  The station is currently owned by Alpha Media, through licensee Digity 3E License, LLC, and features programming from ABC News Radio, Bloomberg Radio, Compass Media Networks, Premiere Networks, and Westwood One. KFOR's studios are located on Cornhusker Highway in Northeast Lincoln, while its transmitter array (including the FM translator K268DF's transmitter) is located on Vine Street east of downtown Lincoln.

History

KFOR was originally located in David City, Nebraska, where it first went on the air in March 1924 as the fourth radio station in Nebraska. New owners moved the station to Lincoln in 1927. From May 1953 to March 1954, the station's owners operated a television station, KFOR-TV.

The radio ministry Back to the Bible originated on KFOR in 1939.

On February 15, 2023, at midnight, KFOR began simulcasting on sister station KLMS (who dropped their long-running sports talk format), and began simulcasting on K268DF (101.5 FM), which relayed KLMS. The next day, KFOR's former translator, K277CA, began relaying KLMS, who flipped to an adult hits format as "Mix 103.3".

On-air personalities
 Cathy Blythe, Problems and Solutions
 Carol Turner, morning show co-host
 Chris Schmidt, morning show co-host (2021 Nebraska Sportscaster of The Year)
 Dale Johnson, KFOR News Director & morning news anchor
 Charlie Brogan, afternoon news anchor/reporter
 Jeff Motz, morning show sports anchor/midday news anchor/sports director (2020 Nebraska Sportscaster of The Year)

Notable alumni
 Scott Young, former morning show co-host (1982–2001)
 Ward Jacobson, former sports reporter and morning show co-host (1985–2006)
 Dick Perry, longtime sportscaster and voice of Nebraska Football
 Bill Wood, Dick Perry's co-host on “The Musical Clock” for more than 15 years 
 Tim Moreland, former sports director and play-by-play voice of Nebraska football
 Wade Hilligoss, afternoon sports anchor
 Dave Hilligoss, former on-air personality (1984-2016) and former morning show co-host (2012-2016)

References

External links

FCC History Cards for KFOR

FOR
News and talk radio stations in the United States
Alpha Media radio stations
Mass media in Lincoln, Nebraska
1924 establishments in Nebraska